El Nasir Football Club, also known as Nasir FC or Nasir FC Juba, is a national football club owned by South Sudan Police founded in 1947. It won the inaugural South Sudan Cup in 2012, and wasthe first to represent South Sudan in the CAF Confederation Cup the same year.

Nasir FC based in the city of Juba and affiliated to Juba Local Football Association, SSFA, CECAFA, CAF, and FIFA.
Nasir football Club was established as police football club which was by then under the police administration. the club was affiliated to the Sudan football Association as a member club of Juba Local Football Association that represented the Southern region of the Sudan in general and the Equatorial region in particular.  when Southern Sudan gained its independence in 2011, South Sudan Football Association was admitted in CAF and FIFA respectively in 2012, Thus, automatically Nasir FC fall under the new SSFA. 
By the early 1950s, the police handed the club administration to the civilians while supporting the club from distance with the little finances they can afford in order for the club to run their affairs. In accordance with Nasir FA Statue, the club is run by the Board of Director with its President as the head of the administration, supported by club CEO which is known commonly as the Secretary.
From 1947 up to date, the club had more than 15 presidents. However, because Nasir FC do not have clear details of its former Presidents who served the club due to the situation in which the Southern Sudan was in, the records of those Presidents who have reigned in the club in the past eight decades might not be officially documented.

The club’s Presidents that are known in its history are the following: Osman Mahani the founder of Police football club, whose notable contribution was the construction of the police club in the heart of Juba town, Colonel John Akot, Lagu whose second name is not known, Major general Ajang Riek,  Lt.Gen. Nikolas Dimo, Mr. Joseph Sabit , Makelele, Mr. Solomon  Lago Odosi  Mr. Emmanuel Benjamin Oyik,  and lastly Mr. Yohanis Musa Pouk - the current Nasir FC President (Former Vice President of South Sudan Football Association) who  was elected to the office in the year 2022.

Achievements
The club’s funniest success came in 1971 when President Nimer flew to Chad, as he was in Chad there’s an allegation and rumors surfaced that coup did take place in Khartoum by colonel Hassim Al Atah has taken over the Nimeri’s government through radio Omdurman, but when Radio Omdurman got technical problem, it was Radio Juba which confirmed that coup did not take place in Khartoum. Then that same year of 1971 Juba local football Association has organized a football match for welcoming the Country’s president from Chad to address the nation and the criteria taken in organizing the match by the local football association was by selecting the top two teams which pitted Malakia against Nasir. And during that match Nasir went on to become victorious by beating Malakia soccer club by two goals to one {2:1}.

Being the top team in the Southern region in 1975 Nasir football club was invited to take part in friendly match organised by the late president Nimeri and the match pitted Nasir against Al Merik of Sudan but the game didn’t go well for the invited team which they went on to lose to the host team Al Merik two goals to one {2:1}

Nasir FC has been successful during the old Sudan of which they went to Rapp up three trophies during that period which the years are not chronologically detailed down in records.
In 1976 the top two teams Nasir and Kator were brought together to play in a match organized by Juba local football Association in welcoming the president once again and this game between Nasir and Kator went on successfully in favor of the Mighty Nasir as they beat kator two goals to nil {2:0}.  let us remember that the first game organized for welcoming the president came in 1971 as mentioned earlier on which means any game organized by welcoming the president of the country Nasir became the first team in history to feature both, and the Nasir FC won both of those games. the first was against Malakia SC in 1971 of which Nasir emerged victorious and the second game in 1976 also went in favor of Nasir FC.
When Sudan was still one country, the club was successful for five consecutive years from the year 2001 to 2005, the team won all the Juba local football leagues for five years in a row, which no team in the history of Juba local football Association has ever won five titles in a row. As such, Nasir FC is the first club in history to have ever achieved that in history of Juba Local Football Association.

Performance in CAF competitions
As football was still developing under the new South Sudan Football Association (SSFA) in which Nasir became affiliated to, the team’s notable success came in the first year of South Sudan’s existence by becoming the first team to lift the South Sudan local league in Juba and first club to do so in the South Sudan cup Nationally by beating Meriek Renk.

The team looked forward for the continental showdowns, the CAF Confederation Cup which is the second tire football competition after the CAF Champions League, Nasir football club became the first team in the history of South Sudan to play in CAF Confederation’s cup.
Remember the CAF Confederation Cup, known as the TotalEnergies CAF Confederation Cup for sponsorship purposes, is an annual association football club competition established in 2004 from a merger of the CAF Cup and the African Cup Winners' Cup and organized by Confederation of African Football (CAF). And during draws in the year 2012 Nasir football club were pitted against Azam football club of Tanzania during the preliminary playoffs in which they went on to lose to the Tanzania based team.

External links
Nasir FC Juba, on National Football Teams

Football clubs in South Sudan